The 1995 Torneo Descentralizado was the 80th season of Peruvian football. A total of 16 teams competed in the tournament. The season began on March 4 and concluded on December 27 with the victory of Universitario de Deportes over Alianza Lima for the second berth to the 1996 Copa Libertadores. Sporting Cristal successfully defended its national title after finishing 12 points ahead of Alianza Lima and Universitario.

Changes from 1994
Torneo Apertura was removed; Torneo Descentralizado immediately began and played on a home-and-away basis between the 16 clubs.
The Octagonal was played at the end of the season with the 8 best-placed teams of the first phase.
In the Octagonal, the 8 clubs played a further 14 rounds to determine the national champion and the berths to the Copa Libertadores and Copa CONMEBOL.

Teams

League table

Octogonal Final

Extra match

Universitario qualified for the 1996 Copa Libertadores.

External links 
 RSSSF Peru 1995 by Carlos Manuel Nieto Tarazona

Peru
Football (soccer)
Peruvian Primera División seasons